Saprinus lugens is a species of clown beetle in the family Histeridae. It is found in Europe and Northern Asia (excluding China), Central America, and North America.

References

Further reading

 

Histeridae
Articles created by Qbugbot
Beetles described in 1834